Count Lope I (died in 948) was the Count of Pallars, ruling jointly with his brother Isarn from 920.

Life 
Lope was son of Raymond I, Count of Pallars and Ribagorza and thus a brother of Isarn, as well as of Bernard I and Miro of Ribagorza.  He would seem also to have been brother of Ato, Bishop of Pallars, who was called brother of Bernard and who collaborated with the latter and with Isarn in fighting the Moors who had overrun their counties.  During Lope's joint reign, Isarn seems to have taken the lead, and Isarn appears to have outlived Lope, being directly succeeded by Lope's sons.

Lope was married to Goltregoda of Cerdanya. 

Issue
Raymond II of Pallars
Borrell I of Pallars
Suñer I
Sunifredo
Riquilda

Lope was eventually succeeded by his sons.

Notes

Counts of Pallars
948 deaths
10th-century Catalan people